The Slovenský kopov (translated into English as Slovak Hound) is a medium-sized breed of hunting dog of the scenthound type. The breed originated in Slovakia, in Central Europe, and is bred for boar hunting.  The name Black Forest Hound seems to have been created in North America for marketing purposes, since the breed has no connection with the Black Forest. The German name for this breed is Schwarzwildbracke which translates to Wild Boar Hound and not Schwarzwaldbracke which would be Black Forest Hound.

Appearance
The Slovenský kopov or Slovakian Hound is a typical hunting hound in appearance, with a muscular body, long legs, a long tail, and long drop ears. The short coat is always black in colour, with tan markings (black and tan). Dogs should be around  16 kg (35 lbs) in weight and 46 cm (18 ins) at the withers, with bitches somewhat smaller. Ideal size is described in the breed standard to discourage the breeding of overly large or excessively small dogs. Other measurements for the ideal hound are given in the Standard, in order to preserve breed type. The breed is more heavily built than the similarly marked American Black and Tan Coonhound, but is more lightly built than the otherwise similar Ogar Polski, the more strongly built hound from Poland. The eyes are always dark, deep-set, and have a look of liveliness and courage.

Temperament
Though known to be independent, it is intelligent, and is easy to train. Also, it is blessed with a good sense of direction.

History and use

A well-known type of hunting dog since antiquity, today's breed was first recognised in the 1870s. The breeds of Brandlbracke (Austrian Black and Tan Hound), Chart Polski (Polish Greyhound), and Magyar agár (Hungarian Greyhound) are believed to have been used in the breed's background. The etymology of the name seems to refer to the dog's colour. The breed club was established in Bratislava in 1988.

The Slovenský kopov was developed and is used as a hunting dog, not a pet or showdog. It is bred for hunting large game, especially wild boar.  Although extremely common in its area of origin, it is rarely seen in other countries. The Slovenský kopov is similar to other East European scenthounds in appearance and hunting style.

Recognition 
The breed is recognised in its country of origin with the name Slovenský kopov, and is listed for international dog sports competition with the Fédération Cynologique Internationale under that name as breed number 244, in Group 6, Scenthounds and Related Breeds, Section 1.2 Medium-sized Hounds. Exported to North America, the breed is recognised under the English translation of its name, the Slovakian Hound, by the United Kennel Club in the United States. The breed also may be registered under a variety of translations of the name, or created English names such as the Wild Boar Hound (from the German Schwarzwildbracke), with minor kennel clubs, hunting clubs, and internet dog registry businesses, and promoted as a rare breed for those seeking an unusual hunting dog or a unique pet.

See also
 Dogs portal
 List of dog breeds
 Hound
 Scenthound

References

External links 

 Search The Open Directory Project (DMOZ) links for clubs and information about the Slovenský kopov

FCI breeds
Rare dog breeds
Dog breeds originating in Slovakia
Scent hounds